Yousef Ayman (born 7 April 1999) is an Emirati footballer who plays as midfielder for Al Jazira.

References

External links 
 

1999 births
Living people
Emirati footballers
Association football midfielders
Al Jazira Club players
UAE Pro League players